Kistenli-Ivanovka (Kiśtänle-İvanovka) is a rural locality (a selo) in Mikhaylovsky Selsoviet, Bizhbulyaksky District, Bashkortostan, Russia. The population was 290 as of 2010. There are 3 streets.

Geography 
Kistenli-Ivanovka is located 26 km northwest of Bizhbulyak (the district's administrative centre) by road. Sene-Purnas is the nearest rural locality.

References 

Rural localities in Bizhbulyaksky District